Douglas Irvin-Erickson is a political scientist and assistant professor at George Mason University.

Works

References

Year of birth missing (living people)
Living people
George Mason University faculty